E. africanum may refer to:
 Eogavialis africanum, an extinct reptile
 Erythrophleum africanum, a legume species found in Savannahs of tropical Africa